The  was a fleet of the Imperial Japanese Navy established during World War II.

History
The Southwest Area Fleet was an operational command of the Imperial Japanese Navy established on  April 10, 1942 to coordinate naval, air, and ground forces for the invasion, occupation and defense of the Philippines, French Indochina, Malaya, and the Netherlands East Indies.

The 1st, 2nd, 3rd and 4th Southern Expeditionary Fleets and the IJN 13th Air Fleet were under operational control of the Southwest Area Fleet. 

After February 1945, the headquarters of the Southwest Area Fleet was isolated in the Philippines, and the IJN 10th Area Fleet was created in Singapore to take over operational command of its surviving forces, with the exception of the 3rd Southern Expeditionary Fleet, which was also trapped in the Philippines. Through fierce fighting during the American re-occupation of the Philippines, especially in Manila, Cebu and Mindanao, the surviving elements of the Southwest Area Fleet and the 3rd Southern Expeditionary Fleet were largely annihilated by the end of May 1945.

Organization
Southwest Area Fleet (HQ Manila)
First Expeditionary Fleet (Singapore)
Second Expeditionary Fleet (Surabaya)
Third Expeditionary Fleet (Manila)
Fourth Expeditionary Fleet (Ambon)
IJN 13th Air Fleet

Commanders of the IJN Southwest Fleet

Chief of staff

References

Notes

Books

External links

Fleets of the Imperial Japanese Navy
Military units and formations established in 1942
Military units and formations disestablished in 1945